Alcide or Alkides is a 1778 opera by Dmitry Bortniansky, first staged in Venice in 1778.

Recording 

Alcide - Bortniansky; Pasichnyk, Datsko, Zagorulko, Lviv Chamber Choir and Orchestra,  conductor: Jean-Pierre Loré. EROL ER 98001(2 CDs), (1998).

References 

Operas
Operas by Dmitry Bortniansky
Operas based on classical mythology
1778 operas